The São Paulo Zoo is the largest zoo in Brazil. With 824,529 m2 (82.45 hectares [203.7 acres]) of space in what was originally the Atlantic Forest, the zoo is south of the city of São Paulo.

It displays more than 3,200 animals, 102 species of mammals, 216 species of birds, 95 species of reptiles, 15 species of amphibians and 16 species of invertebrates in enclosures that replicate the natural habitats of these animals. The zoo's farm of 572 ha produces vegetables used in the manufacturing of feed for various animals, and material for the enclosures where the animals are. It also has animals that need extra space for mating.

The zoo has a nursery for cubs who are rejected by their mothers, electric incubators and an incubation room for eggs of birds and reptiles. The educational function is emphasized in the zoo. Its library of more than four thousand volumes is open to the public. Its partnerships with other state, federal and foreign institutions includes research that facilitates the preservation of endangered species.

History
The São Paulo Zoo was created in June 1957, from a statement of the then governor Jânio Quadros to the head of the São Paulo State Secretary of Agriculture's Department of Fish and Game, Emilio Varoli. The first animals of exotic origin such as lions, camels, bears and elephants, were acquired from private circuses while Brazilian wild fauna animals, such as jaguars and cock-of-the-rock, were acquired in Manaus.
The opening of the zoo, originally scheduled for January 1958, was postponed due to heavy rains that year, and on 16 March São Paulo Zoo was officially inaugurated featuring 482 animals, including nine deer, two spotted jaguars and one black jaguar, three ocelots, two wild cats, one bear, 23 parrots, three Spix's macaws, and the rhinoceros Cacareco, made famous by the episode when it was elected city councilor in the elections of October 1958.

In its first year of operation, zoo admission was free, and from the creation of the Zoological Park of São Paulo, in 1959, they began to charge for tickets.

Present day

The São Paulo Zoo became the first Brazilian institution to propose and engage in various recovery programs of seriously endangered Brazilian species such as the lion tamarin, small neotropical felids, hyacinth macaw and Lear's macaws, European bison, bush dog, condor, the only snow leopard in Brazil and spectacled bear. Since 1994, the São Paulo Zoo is recognized by the Guinness Book as the largest zoo in Brazil. That same year, the Zoological Park of São Paulo was classified in category "E", the highest, from the Brazilian Institute of Environment and Renewable Natural Resources (IBAMA) for environmental management entities and preservation of species. In May 2001, the area next to the zoo which was occupied by the company "Simba Safari" was reincorporated into the Zoological Park of São Paulo. It was reopened to the public as "Zoo Safari" on June 5 of that year, providing tours where one can see the animals in the woods or drive through areas where animals roam.

References

External links

Official site 

Zoos in Brazil
1957 establishments in Brazil
Zoos established in 1957
Tourist attractions in São Paulo